Dalen/Krokslätts FF is a Swedish football club located in Mölndal.

Background
Dalen/Krokslätts Fotbollsförening is a football club from the district of Krokslätt in Gothenburg. The club played under the name Krokslätts FF and for eight seasons competed in the second highest Swedish league. Their greatest success was in the 1932/33 season when they won the Division Two West and qualified for the promotion playoffs for the Allsvenskan. In the play-offs they met Halmstads BK but lost both matches, going down 0–4 on aggregate. [1] The club has also played seventeen seasons in the third highest division.

Dalen/Krokslätts FF currently plays in Division 4 Göteborg B which is the sixth tier of Swedish football. They play their home matches at the Krokslättsvallen in Mölndal.

The club is affiliated to Göteborgs Fotbollförbund. Dalen/Krokslätts FF played in the 2006 Svenska Cupen but lost 1–2 at home to Tenhults IF in the first round. This is the only time that theyhave competed in the Svenska Cupen.

Season to season

In their most successful period Krokslätts FF competed in the following divisions:

In recent seasons Dalen/Krokslätts FF have competed in the following divisions:

Footnotes

External links
 Dalen/Krokslätts FF – Official website

Dalen Krokslatt FF
Association football clubs established in 1985
1995 establishments in Sweden
Football clubs in Västra Götaland County

lt:Krokslätts IK